Achhandapali village is located in Bheden Block of Bargarh district of Odisha,  India.
It belongs to Luhakhandi Panchayat.
Villages close to Achhandapali are Barpadar, Hiromunda, Jampali, Luhakhandi, Pankeldadar, Pudapali.

References

Villages in Bargarh district